For information on all Houston Baptist University sports, see Houston Baptist Huskies

The Houston Baptist Huskies women's basketball team, known as the Houston Baptist Huskies until 2022, is the women's basketball team that represents Houston Christian University in Houston, Texas. The team currently competes in the Southland Conference. The Huskies are currently coached by Donna Finnie.

History
The Huskies have played women's basketball since 1999. In 2022, HBU clinched its regular season title, the first in program history, and the first outright Southland conference title in any sport in school history.

Postseason results

WNIT results
The Huskies have appeared in the Women's National Invitation Tournament (WNIT) once. Their combined record is 0–1.

NAIA Division I
The Huskies made eight appearances in the NAIA Division I women's basketball tournament, with a combined record of 14–8.

Roster

References

External links 
 

 
Basketball teams established in 1999
1999 establishments in Texas